The Beiar River is a river in the municipality of Beiarn in Nordland, Norway. The river begins at the Svartisen glacier high in the mountains near the municipal borders of Beiarn, Meløy, and Rana inside the Saltfjellet-Svartisen National Park. The river then flows north and then west through the Beiar Valley to the head of Beiar Fjord.

References

Rivers of Nordland
Beiarn
Rivers of Norway